The 2004–05 NBA season was the 59th season for the Boston Celtics in the National Basketball Association. The team hired Doc Rivers to be their head coach for the upcoming season. During the offseason, the Celtics acquired All-Star guard Gary Payton, and former Celtics forward Rick Fox from the Los Angeles Lakers, but Fox would retire before the season. The Celtics struggled playing under .500 for the first half of the season. At midseason, Payton was traded to the Atlanta Hawks for former Celtic All-Star forward Antoine Walker. However, Payton would never suit up for the Hawks and was released shortly after. He then re-signed with the Celtics afterwards for the remainder of the season. The team went on a 7-game winning streak in March, finishing first place in the Atlantic Division with a 45–37 record. Paul Pierce was selected for the 2005 NBA All-Star Game.

Despite their mediocre record, the Celtics earned the #3 seed in the Eastern Conference. In the  playoffs, they lost to the 6th-seeded Indiana Pacers in a seven-game first round series. Boston did not return to the playoffs until 2008 en route to the championship. Following the season, Walker was traded to the Miami Heat, while Payton went along with him signing as a free agent with the Heat will go to win the championship the following season.

Draft picks

Roster

Regular season

Standings

Record vs. opponents

Game log

Playoffs

|- align="center" bgcolor="#ccffcc"
| 1
| April 23
| Indiana
| W 102–82
| Raef LaFrentz (21)
| Paul Pierce (9)
| Gary Payton (7)
| FleetCenter18,624
| 1–0
|- align="center" bgcolor="#ffcccc"
| 2
| April 25
| Indiana
| L 79–82
| Paul Pierce (32)
| Pierce, Walker (7)
| Paul Pierce (5)
| FleetCenter18,624
| 1–1
|- align="center" bgcolor="#ffcccc"
| 3
| April 28
| @ Indiana
| L 76–99
| Paul Pierce (19)
| Antoine Walker (9)
| Gary Payton (6)
| Conseco Fieldhouse18,345
| 1–2
|- align="center" bgcolor="#ccffcc"
| 4
| April 30
| @ Indiana
| W 110–79
| Paul Pierce (30)
| Jefferson, Pierce (7)
| Paul Pierce (8)
| Conseco Fieldhouse18,345
| 2–2
|- align="center" bgcolor="#ffcccc"
| 5
| May 3
| Indiana
| L 85–90
| Paul Pierce (27)
| three players tied (7)
| four players tied (3)
| FleetCenter18,624
| 2–3
|- align="center" bgcolor="#ccffcc"
| 6
| May 5
| @ Indiana
| W 92–89 (OT)
| Antoine Walker 24
| Al Jefferson 14
| Paul Pierce 6
| Conseco Fieldhouse18,345
| 3–3
|- align="center" bgcolor="#ffcccc"
| 7
| May 7
| Indiana
| L 70–97
| Antoine Walker (20)
| three players tied (7)
| Gary Payton (7)
| FleetCenter18,624
| 3–4
|-

Transactions

Trades

Free agents

Additions

Subtractions

See also
2004–05 NBA season

References

External links
2004–05 Boston Celtics season at Basketball Reference

Boston Celtics seasons
Boston Celtics
Boston Celtics
Boston Celtics
Celtics
Celtics